Shahrasb may refer to:
 Shahr Asb, village in Iran
Shahrasb (Shahnameh), mythical character